Syneches ater is a species of hybotid dance flies, insects in the family Hybotidae.

References

Hybotidae
Articles created by Qbugbot
Insects described in 1927